The men's eight rowing competition at the 1980 Summer Olympics took place at the Krylatskoye Rowing Canal in Moscow, Soviet Union. The event was held from 21 to 26 July. There were 9 boats (81 competitors) from 9 nations, with each nation limited to a single boat in the event. The first two places were the same as in 1976, with East Germany successfully defending its title (the third nation to do so, after the United States and Great Britain) and Great Britain repeating as runner-up. The 1976 bronze medalist, New Zealand, was not competing; the Soviet Union took bronze in 1980.

Background

This was the 18th appearance of the event. Rowing had been on the programme in 1896 but was cancelled due to bad weather. The men's eight has been held every time that rowing has been contested, beginning in 1900.

Beginning with an Olympic bronze medal in 1972 and running through the 1970s, East Germany had risen to take a dominant place in men's eight competitions. By the time of the Moscow Games, the East Germans were the reigning (1976) Olympic champions and four-time reigning (1975, 1977, 1978, and 1979) World champions. Two major competitors, New Zealand and West Germany, were absent in 1980; East Germany was thus heavily favoured over the nearest competitors (host Soviet Union).

Bulgaria made its debut in the event. Great Britain made its 14th appearance, most among nations competing in 1980 and tied with the absent Canada for second-most behind the also-absent United States at 15.

Competition format

The "eight" event featured nine-person boats, with eight rowers and a coxswain. It was a sweep rowing event, with the rowers each having one oar (and thus each rowing on one side). This rowing competition consisted of two main rounds (semifinals and finals), as well as a repechage round after the semifinals. The course used the 2000 metres distance that became the Olympic standard in 1912 (with the exception of 1948). Races were held in up to six lanes.

 Semifinals: Two heats with four or five boats each. The top boat in each semifinal (2 boats total) went to the "A" final, while the remaining boats (7 total) went to the repechage.
 Repechage: Two heats with three or four boats each. The top two boats in each heat (4 boats total) advanced to the "A" final, with the remainder (3 boats) to the "B" final (out of medal contention).
 Finals: The "A" final consisted of the top six boats, competing for the medals and 4th through 6th place. The "B" final had the next three boats; they competed for 7th through 9th place.

Schedule

All times are Moscow Time (UTC+3)

Results

Semifinals

The fastest team in each heat advanced to the "A" final. The remaining teams competed in the repechage for the remaining spots in the final.

Semifinal 1

Semifinal 2

Repechage

The two fastest teams in each repechage heat advanced to the "A" final.

Repechage heat 1

Repechage heat 2

Finals

Final B

Final A

References

Sources

Rowing at the 1980 Summer Olympics
Men's events at the 1980 Summer Olympics